At the 2005 Jeux de la Francophonie, the judo events were held in Niamey, Niger. A total of 14 events were contested according to gender and weight division.

Medal winners

Men

Women

Medal table

Doping cases

Musedju Epoka from Democratic Republic of Congo who won silver medal in Men's Extra-lightweight (60 kg) category, tested positive after the competition for Furosemide.

References

2005 Jeux de la Francophonie
Sports competitions in Niger
Judo at the Jeux de la Francophonie
Francophone Games